Guntis Galviņš (born January 25, 1986) is a Latvian professional ice-hockey defenceman, who currently plays for HC Oceláři Třinec in the Czech Extraliga (ELH). Galvins returned to Dinamo Riga of the KHL, on July 8, 2015, signing a one-year contract as a free agent after a stint with Italian club, HCB South Tyrol in the EBEL, the top tier league in Austria. He has played for the Latvian national team.

Career statistics

Regular season and playoffs

International

References

External links
 
 
 
 

1986 births
Living people
AIK IF players
Fehérvár AV19 players
Bolzano HC players
Dinamo Riga players
HC Oceláři Třinec players
HC Yugra players
HK Riga 2000 players
Ice hockey players at the 2010 Winter Olympics
Latvian ice hockey defencemen
Olympic ice hockey players of Latvia
People from Talsi
VHK Vsetín players
HC Vítkovice players
Latvian expatriate sportspeople in the Czech Republic
Latvian expatriate sportspeople in Russia
Latvian expatriate sportspeople in Sweden
Latvian expatriate sportspeople in Italy
Latvian expatriate sportspeople in Hungary
Expatriate ice hockey players in the Czech Republic
Expatriate ice hockey players in Sweden
Expatriate ice hockey players in Hungary
Expatriate ice hockey players in Italy
Expatriate ice hockey players in Russia
Latvian expatriate ice hockey people